Boubker Slimani (born 3 June 1952) is a Moroccan judoka. He competed in the men's middleweight event at the 1972 Summer Olympics.

References

1952 births
Living people
Moroccan male judoka
Olympic judoka of Morocco
Judoka at the 1972 Summer Olympics
Place of birth missing (living people)
African Games medalists in judo
Competitors at the 1973 All-Africa Games
African Games bronze medalists for Morocco
20th-century Moroccan people